Gibellulopsis nigrescens is a species of fungus belonging to the family Plectosphaerellaceae.

It has cosmopolitan distribution.

References

Sordariomycetes